Carl Burckhardt or Karl Burckhardt may refer to:

Johann Karl Burckhardt (1773–1825), German astronomer and mathematician
Karl Burckhardt-Iselin (1830–1893), Swiss politician
Carl Nathanael Burckhardt (1878–1923), Swiss painter and sculptor
Carl Jacob Burckhardt (1891–1974), Swiss diplomat and historian